The 2015 International Darts Open was the fifth of nine PDC European Tour events on the 2015 PDC Pro Tour. The tournament took place at the SACHSENarena, Riesa, between 19–21 June 2015. It featured a field of 48 players and £115,000 in prize money, with £25,000 going to the winner.

Michael Smith won his second European title after defeating Benito van de Pas 6–3 in the final. 

Van de Pas ended Michael van Gerwen's winning streak of 21 games on the 2015 European tour and hit the two best checkouts (167 and 158) of the tournament en route to the final.

Prize money
The prize fund was increased to £115,000 after being £100,000 for the previous two years.

Qualification and format

The top 16 players from the PDC ProTour Order of Merit on 9 May 2015 automatically qualified for the event. The remaining 32 places went to players from three qualifying events - 20 from the UK Qualifier (held in Crawley on 15 May), eight from the European Qualifier (held in Riesa on 18 June) and four from the Host Nation Qualifier (also held on 18 June). The following players took part in the tournament:

Top 16
  Michael van Gerwen (third round)
  Peter Wright (third round)
  Michael Smith (winner)
  Brendan Dolan (third round)
  Simon Whitlock (second round)
  Vincent van der Voort (second round)
  Ian White (semi-finals)
  Mervyn King (second round)
  Justin Pipe (quarter-finals)
  Robert Thornton (third round)
  Terry Jenkins (quarter-finals)
  Kim Huybrechts (semi-finals)
  Dave Chisnall (quarter-finals)
  Steve Beaton (third round)
  Jamie Caven (second round)
  Benito van de Pas (runner-up)

UK Qualifier 
  Stephen Bunting (quarter-finals)
  Ken MacNeil  (first round)
  John Henderson (first round)
  Jamie Robinson (first round)
  Matt Clark (second round)
  Dean Winstanley (first round)
  Matthew Edgar (second round)
  Jamie Lewis (second round)
  Mark Barilli (second round)
  Mark Webster (first round)
  Mark Walsh (first round)
  Darren Webster (first round)
  William O'Connor (second round)
  James Wilson (second round)
  Daryl Gurney (third round)
  Eddie Dootson (first round)
  Kevin McDine (first round)
  Adam Hunt (first round)
  Mickey Mansell (second round)
  Jonny Clayton (second round)

European Qualifier
  Christian Kist (first round)
  Mensur Suljović (second round)
  Cristo Reyes (second round)
  Mike De Decker (first round)
  Rowby-John Rodriguez (third round)
  Antonio Alcinas (first round)
  Robert Marijanović (second round)
  Jeffrey de Zwaan (first round)

Host Nation Qualifier
  Max Hopp (third round)
  Jyhan Artut (first round)
  Daniel Zygla (first round)
  Tomas Seyler (second round)

Draw

References

2015 PDC European Tour
2015 in German sport